Minot Bypass may refer to:
U.S. Route 83 Bypass, a bypass of U.S. Route 83 to the west of Minot, North Dakota
A loop around the city that consists of portions of U.S. Route 83 Bypass, as well as U.S. Route 2 and U.S. Route 52

Roads in North Dakota
Transportation in Ward County, North Dakota